Cantillation is an Australian vocal ensemble founded in 2001 by Antony Walker and Alison Johnston. They were founded alongside orchestras Sinfonia Australis and Orchestra of the Antipodes.

Cantillation often performs with the Pinchgut Opera and appear on many ABC Classics albums. Albums they appear on include Teddy Tahu Rhodes' The Voice (ARIA winner) and David Hobson's Handel Arias (ARIA nominee).

Discography

Charting albums

Albums
Cantillation
Silent Night (2004) – ABC Classics
Serenity (2008) – ABC Classics
Bohemian Rhapsody: Choral Pop (2015) – ABC Classics
Cantillation, Antony Walker
Prayer for Peace (2002) – ABC Classics
Allegri Miserere (2003) – ABC Classics
Ye Banks & Braes (2006) – ABC Classics
Hallelujah! (2007) – ABC Classics
Cantillation, Sara Macliver, Teddy Tahu Rhodes, Sinfonia Australis, Antony Walker 
Fauré: Requiem (2001) – ABC Classics
Cantillation, Sara Macliver, Jonathan Summers, Paul McMahon, Australian Virtuosi, Synergy Percussion, Sydney Children's Choir, Antony Walker
Carmina Burana (2002) – ABC Classics
David Hobson, Sinfonia Australis, Cantillation, Antony Walker
Handel Arias (2002) – ABC Classics
Sara Macliver, Alexandra Sherman, Christopher Field, Paul McMahon, Teddy Tahu Rhodes, Cantillation, Orchestra of the Antipodes,  Antony Walker
Handel: Messiah (2002) – ABC Classics
Handel: Messiah Highlights (2003) – ABC Classics
Jane Sheldon, Cantillation, Sinfonia Australis
Song of the Angel (2003) – ABC Classics
Teddy Tahu Rhodes, Sinfonia Australia, Orchestra of the Antipodes, Cantillation, Antony Walker
The Voice (2004) – ABC Classics
Emma Kirkby, Cantillation, Orchestra of the Antipodes, Antony Walker
Magnificat (2006) – ABC Classics
Pinchgut Opera
Semele (2003) – ABC Classics
Purcell: The Fairy-Queen (2004) – ABC Classics
Monteverdi: L'Orfeo (2005) – ABC Classics
Rameau: Dardanus (2006) – ABC Classics
Charpentier: David and Jonathan (2009) – ABC Classics
Iphigénie en Tauride (2015) – ABC Classics

References

External links

Australian vocal groups
Australian classical music groups
2001 establishments in Australia
Musical groups established in 2001